Bleep may refer to:
 Bleep sound, a noise, generally of a single tone, often generated by a machine
 Bleep censor, the replacement of offensive language (swear words) or personal details with a beep sound
 Bleep techno, a Yorkshire-born subgenre of techno music, that was popular in the early 1990s
 Bleep (store), an online music store established by Warp Records
 A term for a pager, especially in medical institutions
 Colonel Bleep, the first colour cartoon ever made for television
 Bleep, a fictional character in the Josie and the Pussycats cartoon
 Bleep, an episode of Arthur.

See also
What the Bleep Do We Know!?, a 2004 film
Bleep My Dad Says, a television sitcom